Maurice Hewitt (6 October 1884 – 7 November 1971) was a French violinist and conductor, as well as a member of the French Resistance during World War II.

Life 
Born in Asnières-sur-Seine, Hewitt studied the violin at the Conservatoire de Paris. From 1914, he was a member of the ensemble Société des Instruments anciens, from 1909 to 1930 a member of the Capet Quartet, which was particularly dedicated to the interpretation of Beethoven's string quartets. From 1930 to 1943 he led his own quartet, and in 1941 he founded the Orchestre de Chambre Hewitt.

He also founded the record company Les Discophiles Français. Here he released six albums until 1942, including the first recording of Jean-Philippe Rameaus Six Concerts en Sextuor. On further albums he released e.g. Mozarts's Clarinet Concerto KV 622 (with François Étienne), François Couperin's L'Impériale and L'Apothéose de Lulli and Mozarts's String Trios with the Trio Pasquier (Jean Pasquier, violin, Pierre Pasquier, viola und Étienne Pasquier, cello).

From 1940 Hewitt was active in the Resistance, where he belonged to Colonel Maurice Buckmaster's network. In 1943 he was denounced and arrested and in 1944 deported to the Buchenwald Concentration Camp (prison number 44007). There he founded an illegal string quartet with Polish inmates.

After the liberation of France in 1945, he gave a concert with Gabriel Fauré's Requiem in memory of the French who were deported to Germany and died there. Hewitt was active as a conductor and music teacher until the 1950s.

He died in Créteil in 1971.

Bibliography 
 Konzentrationslager Buchenwald 1937-1945. Begleitband zur ständigen historischen Ausstellung. published by the memorial Buchenwald, Göttingen 1999

References

External links 
 Couperin, L'Imperiale (Maurice Hewitt Chamber Orch., 1941) (YouTube)

Buchenwald concentration camp survivors
20th-century French male classical violinists
Conservatoire de Paris alumni
French male conductors (music)
French Resistance members
1884 births
1971 deaths
People from Asnières-sur-Seine
20th-century French conductors (music)